Louise Camrass (born 1969 in London) is a film maker and artist. She received her master's degree in fine art at the Royal College of Art (1999) and BA (Hons) in painting at Central St Martins School of Art (1994). She also received a Rome Scholarship in 2002. She has worked in various formats, predominantly on film and videos but also still life paintings, portraits and photographs.

Her background stems from fine art painting but gravitated towards the moving images and sound because of its capacity to encompass narrative, abstraction, colour and movement for emotive effect through three-dimensional space but resulting like painting in a two-dimensional object. While still a painter she became interested in scale, sound, dialogue and moving pictures and in the absolute attention required by the viewer in a cinema environment, in its ability to provoke strong emotional responses from an audience. She continues to paint, and deconstructs film ideas for installation purposes. The content of her work evolves from the life experiences of herself and her friends, the imagination, abstract thoughts, observations, and a desire to play with the language of film and art.

She lives in London, England.

Excerpt

Her short film "Cows" (a new viewpoint on a familiar animal) was a winner of the Channel 4 FourDocs best four-minute documentary competition and was screened by Channel 4 on television as a 3 Minute Wonder.

"Cows breathe heavily in a field, sun drowns a courtyard, an open car drives into the city, facetious young girls joke about older men, a young woman meets her father on her birthday; in the series of short films by Louise Camrass. They are awkward and yet funny. Camrass manages in even more short time to convey the filmic equivalent of a short story."—Notes from conversations on the artists' work held at different times between Keith Tyson, Sacha Craddock and Simon Morrisey and between Susan Hiller, Sacha Craddock and Des Lawrence - from newcontemporaries 2008

In 2006, Louise completed a residency and showed at the Capellades Paper Mill Museum in Spain: 
 The British School at Rome: Fine Arts Scholars

Other recent notable mentions include:
 a science-art-music-engineering collaboration with the University of Glasgow
 supported by the Royal Academy of Engineering 
 Street Vibe Festival of Sound, The Scoop at More London, June 2008
 Artprojx Presents Still Film at Tate Britain, June 2008
 Excite! world premiere with London Philharmonic Orchestra at Royal Festival Hall, June 2008

External links
Louise Camrass
 The Future Can Wait, Atlantis Gallery, Brick Lane, London
Videographe, Canada: Dominique & Louise
CNC machine screened at Sadlers Wells
 Liverpool Biennial Archive
Estorick Collection: British Artists in Rome
Responding to Rome: British Artists in Rome, 1995-2005
Bloomberg Space: The Mind is a Horse Part I
Bloomberg Space: The Mind is a Horse Part II
Full Circle Contemporary Art Consultancy, Exhibition
Louise T Blouin Institute: Art After Dark: White Label Orchestra Shares the KEY TO JOY

1969 births
20th-century British painters
21st-century British painters
Photographers from London
British film directors
Living people
Alumni of the Royal College of Art